This article lists the results for the Thailand national football team between 1970 and 1979.

 Only record the results that affect the FIFA/Coca-Cola World Ranking. See FIFA 'A' matches criteria.

1970

1971

1972

1973

1974

1975

1976

1977

1978

1979

References

External links

1970
1970s in Thai sport